Ariel Washington Hukporti (born 12 April 2002) is a German-Togolese professional basketball player for Melbourne United of the National Basketball League (NBL).

Early life and youth career
Hukporti was born in Stralsund, Germany to Togolese parents and was raised by a single mother. He grew up playing football as a defender. He began playing in the Jugend Basketball Bundesliga, the German U16 league, with USC Freiburg. After one season, he received offers from renowned clubs, including Bayern Munich and Brose Bamberg. He decided to continue his career with Riesen Ludwigsburg and its junior team, Porsche BBA Ludwigsburg.

In December 2018, at the Adidas Next Generation Tournament (ANGT) Valencia, Hukporti averaged 18 points, 15.2 rebounds and 2.5 steals per game for U18 Porsche Ludwigsburg, while leading the event in blocks (1.8 per game) and index rating (26.7). He helped his team to fourth place and was named to the all-tournament team. In 2019, Hukporti was honored as Rookie of the Year and All-Star Game MVP in the Nachwuchs Basketball Bundesliga (NBBL), the German U19 league. He played for U18 Porsche Ludwigsburg at ANGT Munich in February 2020 but did not return to action after suffering a foot injury in his second game. Hukporti was named NBBL MVP for the 2019–20 season after averaging 16.9 points and 9.4 rebounds per game for Porsche BBA Ludwigsburg.

Professional career

Riesen Ludwigsburg (2018–2020)
On 12 December 2018, Hukporti made his professional debut for Riesen Ludwigsburg, scoring four points in one minute in an 88–76 loss to Banvit at the Basketball Champions League. On 13 January 2019, he debuted in the Basketball Bundesliga (BBL) versus medi Bayreuth. At the NBA All-Star Weekend in Chicago in February 2020, Hukporti was named MVP of the Basketball Without Borders camp. On 11 June 2020, he scored a career-high 10 points along with three rebounds and two blocks in a 103–74 win over Brose Bamberg in the preliminary round of the 2020 BBL Final Tournament. In the 2019–20 season, Hukporti averaged three points and 2.3 rebounds in 7.9 minutes per game.

Nevėžis Kėdainiai (2020–2021)
On 3 July 2020, Hukporti signed with Nevėžis Kėdainiai of the Lithuanian Basketball League (LKL).

Melbourne United (2021–present)
On 28 July 2021, Hukporti signed as a Next Star with Melbourne United of the Australian National Basketball League (NBL).

During the 2022 pre-season, Hukporti ruptured his achilles tendon and was ruled out for the entire 2022–23 NBL season.

National team career
Hukporti represented Germany at the 2017 FIBA U16 European Championship in Podgorica. He averaged 5.4 points, 8.9 rebounds and 1.4 blocks for the 13th-place team. In April 2018, he won a gold medal with Germany at the Albert Schweitzer Tournament. Later that year, at the FIBA U16 European Championship in Novi Sad, Hukporti averaged 9.6 points and 5.9 rebounds, leading his team to ninth place. He averaged 10.1 points, 6.4 rebounds and 1.6 blocks at the 2019 FIBA U18 European Championship in Volos as his team finished in 11th place.

References

Living people
2002 births
BC Nevėžis players
Centers (basketball)
German men's basketball players
German people of Togolese descent
Melbourne United players
People from Stralsund
Power forwards (basketball)
Riesen Ludwigsburg players
Citizens of Togo through descent
Togolese men's basketball players
Sportspeople from Mecklenburg-Western Pomerania